The Htupayon Pagoda is a Buddhist stupa located in Mrauk U, Rakhine State, Myanmar. Construction of the pagoda was commissioned by King Min Ran Aung in 1494. The eight-year-old king likely never saw the completion of the pagoda as he was assassinated by his own ministers just six months into his reign. The pagoda, located in the northern sector of Mrauk-U, was considered auspicious by later Arakanese kings who visited its precincts after the coronation ceremony to take an oath for the well being of the country during their reign.

References

Bibliography
 
 

Buildings and structures in Rakhine State
Buddhist temples in Myanmar